Desperado is a steel roller coaster located at the Buffalo Bill's Hotel and Casino in Primm, Nevada, United States. The casino is a part of the Primm Valley Resorts complex. Designed by Arrow Dynamics and fabricated by Intermountain Lift, Inc., Desperado was one of the tallest roller coasters in the world when it opened in 1994 and was listed by the Guinness Book of Records as the world's tallest roller coaster in 1996.

A portion of the ride runs through the interior of the casino. As of February 2020, Desperado is closed and not operating.

History
Gary Primm opened a casino called Buffalo Bill's on May 14, 1994, and he wished to attract people driving on adjacent Interstate 15 to his new casino. Primm contracted Arrow Dynamics to build a highly visible roller coaster. The ride opened to the public on August 11, 1994, as one of the tallest and fastest roller coasters in the world. The ride's  lift hill was the tallest in the United States, second behind only the Pepsi Max Big One at Blackpool Pleasure Beach in England that opened the same year. The Guinness Book of World Records recognized Desperado in its 1996 publication as the tallest roller coaster in the world.

For his Top Secret special that first aired on February 24, 1999, magician Lance Burton staged a death-defying escape in a stunt where he was tied to the roller coaster's track and had to break out of handcuffs in order to escape.

References

External links
 

Buildings and structures in Primm, Nevada
MGM Resorts International
Roller coasters introduced in 1994
Buildings and structures in Clark County, Nevada
Roller coasters in Nevada
Tourist attractions in Clark County, Nevada